Saint Aemilianus (or Aemilius) lived in the 5th century AD, and is known as a physician, confessor, and martyr. In the reign of the Arian Vandal King Huneric, he became emmired in the Arian persecution in Africa.  When he resisted conversion to Arianism, he was put to death by being flayed alive.

Aemilianus' feast day is celebrated on December 6 in Roman Catholicism, and on December 7 in Eastern Orthodoxy.

References

484 deaths
5th-century Christian martyrs
Saints from the Vandal Kingdom
Year of birth unknown

|Feast_day:St Aemilianus, martyr of Mesia is on July 18th, according to the Roman martyrology.